Drepanomyces is a genus of fungi in the family Ceratomycetaceae. A monotypic genus, it contains the single species Drepanomyces malayanus.

References

External links
Index Fungorum

Laboulbeniomycetes
Monotypic Laboulbeniomycetes genera